İğdeli is a village in the Burdur District of Burdur Province in Turkey. Its population is 165 (2021).
İğdeli Village is located in Burdur province and İğdeli Village located in Burdur Central Villages district is connected to Burdur Central District. İğdeli Village map location is 37° 31' 24.5136 North and 30° 9' 12.7512 East gps coordinates. İğdeli Village is 24 kilometers away from the center of Burdur district, to which it is connected. The distance of İğdeli Village to Burdur city center is approximately 24 kilometers.

References

Villages in Burdur District